Michael Patton may refer to:

 Mike Patton (Michael Allan Patton, born 1968), American singer-songwriter
 Mike Patton (rugby league) (Michael Patrick Patton), New Zealand 
 Michael Quinn Patton (born 1945), American organizer and consultant

See also
 Michael Paton (disambiguation)